Newark most commonly refers to:

 Newark, New Jersey, city in the United States
 Newark Liberty International Airport, New Jersey; a major air hub in the New York metropolitan area

Newark may also refer to:

Places

Canada 
 Niagara-on-the-Lake, Ontario, once called Newark

Germany 
 Neuwerk (traditional English name Newark), an island and quarter of Hamburg in the German Bight
 Great Tower Neuwerk, tower on the German island Neuwerk, synonymously called Newark in older English texts

United Kingdom 
 Newark-on-Trent, Nottinghamshire, England
 Newark, Orkney, a hamlet on Sanday, Scotland
 Newark, Peterborough in Cambridgeshire, a hamlet
 Newark Wapentake, a former administrative division
 Newark Castle, Fife
 Newark Castle, Selkirkshire
 Newark Park, a country house and estate in Gloucestershire
 Port Glasgow, Scotland, called Newark until 1667
 Newark Castle, Port Glasgow

United States 
 Newark, Arkansas
 Newark, California
 Newark, Delaware
 Newark, Illinois
 Newark, Indiana
 Newark, Maryland
 Newark, Missouri
 Newark, Nebraska
 Newark, New Jersey
 Newark, New York
 Newark Valley (town), New York
 Newark Valley (village), New York
 Newark (island), New York an island in Wayne County On Sodus Bay
 Newark, Ohio
 Newark, South Dakota
 Newark, Texas
 Newark, Vermont, a New England town
 Newark, West Virginia
 Newark, Wisconsin, a town
 Newark (community), Wisconsin, an unincorporated community
 Newark Township (disambiguation)

Education 
 Newark Academy (disambiguation)
 Newark High School (disambiguation)

Transportation

Rail stations

Newark, Nottinghamshire, England
 Newark Castle railway station on the Nottingham to Lincoln line
 Newark North Gate railway station on the East Coast Main Line

Newark, Delaware, United States
 Newark station (Delaware), an Amtrak station in Newark, Delaware

Newark, New Jersey, United States
 Newark Broad Street Station, a New Jersey Transit station
 Newark Liberty International Airport Station, served by multiple rail carriers  including New Jersey Transit
 Pennsylvania Station (Newark), a major transportation hub served by multiple rail and bus carriers including New Jersey Transit

Ships 
 HMS Newark, various ships of the Royal Navy
 USS Newark, various ships of the United States Navy

Other uses 
 Newark (UK Parliament constituency), for the Newark-on-Trent area
 Newark Corporation, Chicago-based electronic components distribution company
 Roman Catholic Archdiocese of Newark, New Jersey
 Newark cipher, a variation of the Pigpen cipher system